The 2014–15 Luge World Cup is a multi race tournament over a season for luge organised by the FIL. The season started on 29 November 2014 in Igls, Austria and ended on 28 February 2015 in Sochi, Russia.

Calendar 
Below is the schedule for the 2014/15 season.

Results

Men's singles

Doubles

Women's singles

Team relay

Standings

Men's singles

|- class="wikitable sortable"  style="background:#f7f8ff; text-align:center; border:gray solid 1px;"
|- style="background:#ccc;"
! style="width:10px;"|Pos.
! style="width:215px;"|Luger
! style="width:45px;"|Points
|-
| 1. ||align="left"|  || 975
|-
| 2. ||align="left"|  || 645
|-  
| 3. ||align="left"|  || 605 
|-
| 4. ||align="left"|  || 556
|-
| 5. ||align="left"|  || 547
|-
| 6. ||align="left"|  || 445
|-
| 7. ||align="left"|  || 431
|-
| 8. ||align="left"|  ||  423
|-
| 9. ||align="left"|  || 423
|-
| 10. ||align="left"|  || 396
|-

Men's doubles

|- class="wikitable sortable"  style="background:#f7f8ff; text-align:center; border:gray solid 1px;"
|- style="background:#ccc;"
! style="width:10px;"|Pos.
! style="width:215px;"|Luger
! style="width:45px;"|Points
|-
| 1. ||align="left"|  || 1071
|-
| 2. ||align="left"|  || 1055
|-  
| 3. ||align="left"|  || 749
|-
| 4. ||align="left"|  || 672
|-
| 5. ||align="left"|  || 607
|-
| 6. ||align="left"|  || 489
|-
| 7. ||align="left"|  || 480
|-
| 8. ||align="left"|  ||  430
|-
| 9. ||align="left"|  || 402
|-
| 10. ||align="left"|  || 392
|-

Women's singles

|- class="wikitable sortable"  style="background:#f7f8ff; text-align:center; border:gray solid 1px;"
|- style="background:#ccc;"
! style="width:10px;"|Pos.
! style="width:215px;"|Luger
! style="width:45px;"|Points
|-
| 1. ||align="left"|  || 1080
|-
| 2. ||align="left"|  || 851
|-  
| 3. ||align="left"|  || 727 
|-
| 4. ||align="left"|  || 686
|-
| 5. ||align="left"|  || 624
|-
| 6. ||align="left"|  || 472
|-
| 7. ||align="left"|  || 470
|-
| 8. ||align="left"|  ||  457
|-
| 9. ||align="left"|  || 371
|-
| 10. ||align="left"|  || 349
|-

Team Relay

|- class="wikitable sortable"  style="background:#f7f8ff; text-align:center; border:gray solid 1px;"
|- style="background:#ccc;"
! style="width:10px;"|Pos.
! style="width:215px;"|Luger
! style="width:45px;"|Points
|-
| 1. ||align="left"|  || 600
|-
| 2. ||align="left"|  || 420
|-  
| 3. ||align="left"|  || 405
|-
| 4. ||align="left"|  || 310
|-
| 5. ||align="left"|   || 295
|-
| 6. ||align="left"|  || 250
|-
| 7. ||align="left"|  || 190
|-
| 8. ||align="left"|  ||  173
|-
| 9. ||align="left"|  || 169
|-
| 10. ||align="left"|  || 138
|-

References

2014-15
2014 in luge
2015 in luge